The 2022 British Columbia municipal elections were held on 15 October 2022. Municipal elections took place in all municipalities and regional district electoral areas in the Canadian province of British Columbia to elect mayors, school board trustees, rural directors and city councillors. Elections BC administered campaign financing, disclosure and advertisement of candidates; however, voting, ballots and candidate nominations were administered by each jurisdiction's local electoral officer.

Incumbents marked with "(X)".

Abbotsford

Mayoral election 
The results for mayor of Abbotsford were as follows:

Abbotsford City Council election 
The results for Abbotsford City Council were as follows:
Top 8 candidates elected

Armstrong
The results in Armstrong were as follows:

Mayoral election

Bulkley-Nechako A (Smithers Rural) Electoral Area
The results in Regional District of Bulkley-Nechako Electoral Area A (Smithers Rural) were as follows:

Director election

Burnaby

Mayoral election
The results for mayor of Burnaby were as follows:

Burnaby City Council election
The results for Burnaby City Council were as follows:
Top 8 candidates elected

Campbell River
The results in Campbell River were as follows:

Mayoral election

Cariboo A (Red Bluff - Quesnel South) Electoral Area
The results in Cariboo Regional District Electoral Area A (Red Bluff - Quesnel South) were as follows:

Director election

Cariboo G (Lac la Hache - 108 Mile Ranch) Electoral Area
The results in Cariboo Regional District Electoral Area G (Lac la Hache - 108 Mile Ranch) were as follows:

Director election

Castlegar
The results in Castlegar were as follows:

Mayoral election

Central Kootenay H (The Slocan Valley) Electoral Area
The results in the Regional District of Central Kootenay Electoral Area H (The Slocan Valley) were as follows:

Director election

Central Saanich
The results in Central Saanich were as follows:

Mayoral election

Chilliwack

Mayoral election
The results for mayor of Chilliwack were as follows:

Chilliwack City Council election
The results for Chilliwack City Council were as follows:

Top 6 candidates elected

Coldstream
The results in Coldstream were as follows:

Mayoral election

Columbia-Shuswap C (Eagle Bay, White Lake, Tappen, Sunnybrae) Electoral Area
The results in Columbia-Shuswap Regional District Electoral Area C (Eagle Bay, White Lake, Tappen, Sunnybrae) were as follows:

Director election

Colwood
The results in Colwood were as follows:

Mayoral election

Comox
The results in Comox were as follows:

Mayoral election

Comox Valley A (Baynes Sound-Denman/Hornby Islands) Electoral Area
The results in Comox Valley Regional District Electoral Area A (Baynes Sound-Denman/Hornby Islands) were as follows:

Director election

Comox Valley B (Lazo North) Electoral Area
The results in Comox Valley Regional District Electoral Area B (Lazo North) were as follows:

Director election

Comox Valley C (Puntledge - Black Creek) Electoral Area
The results in Comox Valley Regional District Electoral Area C (Puntledge - Black Creek) were as follows:

Director election

Coquitlam

Mayoral election
The results for mayor of Coquitlam were as follows:

Coquitlam City Council election
The results for Coquitlam City Council were as follows: 

Top 8 candidates elected

Courtenay
The results in Courtenay were as follows:

Mayoral election

Cowichan Valley B (Shawnigan Lake) Electoral Area
The results in Cowichan Valley Regional District Electoral Area B (Shawnigan Lake) were as follows:

Director election

Cowichan Valley C (Cobble Hill) Electoral Area
The results in Cowichan Valley Regional District Electoral Area C (Cobble Hill) were as follows:

Director election

Cranbrook
The results in Cranbrook were as follows:

Mayoral election

Creston
The results in Creston were as follows:

Mayoral election

Dawson Creek
The results in Dawson Creek were as follows:

Mayoral election

Delta

Mayoral election
The results for mayor Delta are follows:

Delta City Council election
The results for Delta City Council were as follows: 

Top 6 candidates elected

Duncan
The results in Duncan were as follows:

Mayoral election

East Kootenay C Electoral Area
The results in the Regional District of East Kootenay Electoral Area C were as follows:

Director election

Esquimalt
The results in Esquimalt were as follows:

Mayoral election

Fernie
The results in Fernie were as follows:

Mayoral election

Fort St. John
The results in Fort St. John were as follows:

Mayoral election

Hope
The results in Hope were as follows:

Mayoral election

Juan de Fuca Electoral Area
The results in Capital Regional District Electoral Area H (Juan de Fuca) were as follows:

Director election

Kamloops

Mayoral election
The results for mayor of Kamloops were as follows:

Kamloops City Council election
The results for Kamloops City Council were as follows:
Top 8 candidates elected

Kelowna

Mayoral election
The results for mayor of Kelowna were as follows:

Kelowna City Council election
The results for Kelowna City Council were as follows:
Top 8 candidates elected

Kent
The results in Kent were as follows:

Mayoral election

Kimberley
The results in Kimberley were as follows:

Mayoral election

Kitimat
The results in Kitimat were as follows:

Mayoral election

Ladysmith
The results in Ladysmith were as follows:

Mayoral election

Lake Country
The results in Lake Country were as follows:

Mayoral election

Langford

Mayoral election
The results for mayor of Langford were as follows:

Langford City Council election
The results for Langford City Council were as follows: 
Top 6 candidates elected

Langley City
The results in Langley City were as follows:

Mayoral election

Langley Township

Mayoral election
The results for mayor of Langley Township were as follows:

Langley District Council election
The results for Langley District Council were as follows: 
Top 8 candidates elected

Maple Ridge

Mayoral election
The results for mayor of Maple Ridge were as follows:

Maple Ridge City Council election
The results for Maple Ridge City Council were as follows: 
Top 6 candidates elected

Merritt
The results in Merritt were as follows:

Mayoral election

Metchosin
The results in Metchosin were as follows:

Mayoral election

Metro Vancouver Electoral Area A
The results in Metro Vancouver Electoral Area A were as follows:

Director election

Mission

Mayoral election
The results for mayor of Mission were as follows:

Mission City Council election
The results for Mission City Council were as follows: 
Top 6 candidates elected

Nanaimo

Mayoral election
The results for mayor of Nanaimo were as follows:

Nanaimo City Council election
The results for Nanaimo City Council were as follows:
Top 8 candidates elected

Nanaimo A (South Wellington, Cassidy, Cedar)  Electoral Area
The results in the Regional District of Nanaimo Electoral Area A (South Wellington, Cassidy, Cedar) were as follows:

Director election

Nanaimo Regional District E (Nanoose) Electoral Area
The results in the Regional District of Nanaimo Electoral Area E (Nanoose) were as follows:

Director election

Nanaimo F (Coombs, Hilliers, Errington) Electoral Area
The results in the Regional District of Nanaimo Electoral Area F (Coombs, Hilliers, Errington) were as follows:

Director election

Nanaimo G (Dashwood, Englishman River, French Creek) Electoral Area
The results in the Regional District of Nanaimo Electoral Area G (Dashwood, Englishman River, French Creek) were as follows:

Director election

Nelson
The results in Nelson were as follows:

Mayoral election

New Westminster

Mayoral election
The results for mayor of New Westminster were as follows:

New Westminster City Council election
The results for New Westminster City Council were as follows:
Top 6 candidates elected

North Cowichan
The results in North Cowichan were as follows:

Mayoral election

North Saanich
The results in North Saanich were as follows:

Mayoral election

North Vancouver City

Mayoral election
The results for mayor of the City of North Vancouver were as follows:

North Vancouver City Council election
The results for North Vancouver City Council were as follows:
Top 6 candidates elected

North Vancouver District

Mayoral election
The results for mayor of North Vancouver District were as follows:

North Vancouver District Council election
The results for North Vancouver District Council were as follows: 
Top 6 candidates elected

Oak Bay
The results in Oak Bay were as follows:

Mayoral election

Oliver
The results in Oliver were as follows:

Mayoral election

Osoyoos
The results in Osoyoos were as follows:

Mayoral election

Parksville
The results in Parksville were as follows:

Mayoral election

Peace River B Electoral Area
The results in the Peace River Regional District Electoral Area B were as follows:

Director election

Peace River C Electoral Area
The results in the Peace River Regional District Electoral Area C were as follows:

Director election

Peachland
The results in Peachland were as follows:

Mayoral election

Penticton
The results in Penticton were as follows:

Mayoral election

Pitt Meadows
The results in Pitt Meadows were as follows:

Mayoral election

Pitt Meadows City Council election
Top 6 candidates elected

Port Alberni

Mayoral election

Port Coquitlam

Mayoral election
The results for mayor of Port Coquitlam were as follows:

Port Coquitlam City Council election
The results for Port Coquitlam City Council were as follows:
Top 6 candidates elected

Port Moody
The results in Port Moody were as follows:

Mayoral election

Powell River
The results in Powell River were as follows:

Mayoral election

Prince George

Mayoral election
The results for mayor of Prince George were as follows:

Prince George City Council election
The results for Prince George City Council were as follows:

Top 8 candidates elected

Prince Rupert
The results in Prince Rupert were as follows:

Mayoral election

Qualicum Beach
The results in Qualicum Beach were as follows:

Mayoral election

Quesnel
The results in Quesnel were as follows:

Mayoral election

Revelstoke
The results in Revelstoke were as follows:

Mayoral election

Richmond

Mayoral election 
The results for mayor of Richmond were as follows:

Richmond City Council election 
The results for Richmond City Council were as follows: 
Top 8 candidates elected

Saanich

Mayoral election
The results for mayor of Saanich were as follows:

Saanich District Council election
The results for Saanich District Council were as follows:

Top 8 candidates elected

Salmon Arm
The results in Salmon Arm were as follows:

Mayoral election

Salt Spring Island Electoral Area
The results in Capital Regional District Electoral Area F (Salt Spring Island) were as follows:

Director election

Sechelt
The results in Sechelt were as follows:

Mayoral election

Sidney
The results in Sidney were as follows:

Mayoral election

Smithers
The results in Smithers were as follows:

Mayoral election

Sooke
The results in Sooke were as follows:

Mayoral election

Southern Gulf Islands Electoral Area
The results in Capital Regional District Electoral Area G (Southern Gulf Islands) were as follows:

Director election

Spallumcheen
The results in Spallumcheen were as follows:

Mayoral election

Squamish
The results in Squamish were as follows:

Mayoral election

Summerland
The results in Summerland were as follows:

Mayoral election

Surrey

Mayoral election

The results for mayor of Surrey were as follows:

Opinion polls

Surrey City Council election
The results for Surrey City Council were as follows: 
Top 8 candidates elected

Terrace
The results in Terrace were as follows:

Mayoral election

Trail
The results in Trail were as follows:

Mayoral election

Vancouver

Vernon

Mayoral election
The results for mayor of Vernon were as follows:

Vernon City Council election
The results for Vernon City Council were as follows:
Top 6 candidates elected

Victoria

Mayoral election
The results for mayor of Victoria were as follows:

Victoria City Council election
The results for Victoria City Council were as follows: 

Top 8 candidates elected

West Kelowna
The results in West Kelowna were as follows:

Mayoral election

View Royal
The results in View Royal were as follows:

Mayoral election

West Vancouver

Mayoral election
The results for mayor of West Vancouver were as follows:

West Vancouver District Council election
The results for West Vancouver District Council were as follows: 
Top 6 candidates elected

Whistler
The results in Whistler were as follows:

Mayoral election

White Rock
The results in White Rock were as follows:

Mayoral election

Williams Lake
The results in Williams Lake were as follows:

Mayoral election

References

External links
List of candidates 
Results

2022 elections in Canada
2022
Municipal elections
October 2022 events in Canada